Rubbo may refer to:

Antonio Dattilo Rubbo (1870–1955), Italian-born artist and art teacher active in Australia
Don Rubbo (1926–1979), mentor and guide of Peter Max and an affiliate of Andy Warhol
Joe Rubbo (born 1963), American film actor and television producer
Kiffy Rubbo (1944–1980), Australian gallery director and curator
Mariano Rubbo (born 1988), Uruguayan footballer
Michael Rubbo (born 1938), Australian filmmaker, screenwriter and publisher